Charaideo or Che-Rai-Doi (Literally: the shining city on the hills in Ahom language) is a town in Charaideo district, Assam, India and was also the first capital of the Ahom kingdom established by the first Ahom king Chao Lung Siu-Ka-Pha in 1253. Even though the capital moved to other places over the course of the 600 years of rule, Charaideo remained the symbol of Ahom power. It is now known for its collection of maidams, tumuli or burial mounds of the Ahom kings and Ahom royalty.

It is about 30 km from Sivasagar town located in Charaideo district.

Etymology
Charaideo (also Ahom: Che-Rai-Doi; Charai-khorong), the permanent settlement of the first Ahom king Chaolung Sukaphaa, was earlier called Che-Tam-Doi-Phi (literally City-Hill-God) meaning "city of the sacred hill". The name Charaideo originated from Tai-Ahom word Che Rai Doi or Doi Che Rai which means the shining city on the hillsThe Che-Rai-Doi Assamised into Charaideo or Charai-khorong. According to Tai-Bailung-Mohong Buranji (a manuscript in Tai), Sukaphaa was buried in his capital city Che-Rai-Doi.

History
Before the arrival of Sukaphaa the place was a place of worship for local tribes like Moran, Borahi. Though the capital of the Ahom kingdom moved many times, Charaideo remained the symbolic center. It contains sacred burial grounds of Ahom kings and queens and is also the place of ancestral Gods of the Ahoms. The Ahom kings and Queens were buried after extensive and long royal burial rituals. The tombs Maidam of Ahom kings and queens at Charaideo hillocks resemble the shape of the pyramids and are objects of wonder revealing the excellent architecture and skill of the sculptors and masons of Assam of the medieval days.

The actual number of Maidam were more than 150 but only 30 Maidams are protected by the Archaeological Survey of India and Assam State Archaeology Department, and the remaining Maidams are unprotected. Most of these unprotected Maidams are encroached by people and getting damaged. The biggest unprotected Maidam is the Bali Maidam near Nimonagarh. This Maidam is called Bali Maidam, because while British plundered it, they got obstruction from excess sands (Bali) in the surrounding of the Maidam.

Nomination for UNESCO World Heritage Site
Charaideo Maidams is the Ahom equivalent of the Egyptian Pyramids. Prime Minister Narendra Modi has chosen the Maidams from 52 sites across India for the UNESCO nomination. The maidams represent 13-19 century CE- late medieval mound burial tradition of the Tai Ahom community in Assam. The Ahom dynasty lasted for around 600 years till British annexed Assam in 1826.

See also

 Sukaphaa
 Ahom Kingdom
 Singarigharutha
 Ahom Dynasty
 Sibsagar district
 Charaideo district

Notes

References 

 

Capitals of Ahom kingdom
Archaeological sites in Assam
Former populated places in India
Former capital cities in India
Cities and towns in Charaideo district
Charaideo district
1228 establishments in Asia
13th-century establishments in India
Buildings and structures completed in the 13th century
Ahom kingdom
Tourism in Assam